Markavatnet or Markvatnet is a lake that lies in the municipality of Meløy in Nordland county, Norway.

See also
 List of lakes in Norway

References

Meløy
Lakes of Nordland